Red Flag Mangyongdae Revolutionary School is an elite school in Mangyongdae district of Pyongyang, North Korea. Established in 1947, it is a special education school with access only to the Workers' Party of Korea, Korean People's Army, administrative and high-ranking officials’ families. Originally, the school was called the Magyongdae School for the Bereaved Children of Revolutionaries, which was to "receive children of fallen revolutionaries" and "educate their children and train them  into fine revolutionaries after the independence of Korea. It was located at Kan-ri, Daedong, South Pyongan. After the formal establishment of North Korea it was moved to Pyongyang and there the first statue of Kim Il-sung was erected, according to North Korean authorities, at the suggestion of Kim Jong-suk, Kim Il-sung's wife.

, Lt. Col. Kim Hak Bin is an administrator at the school. Ri Kyong Hui is a biology teacher.

At one time, Kim Won-ju, who was Kim Hyong-rok's third son, was assigned the position as State Security Department officer whose assignments included rooting out disloyalty to the regime among students at the ultra-elite Mangyongdae School.".

In addition to a high school curriculum, students receive military training. Graduates enter the army for three years and usually become party members. Generally, about 120 students graduate per year. According to Kang Myong-do, "children of the elite, who in the past would have gone to Namsan now went to Mangyongdae." If the parents of a child were still alive, then only children of officials at least at the level of party department head were eligible to enroll.

In 1982, O Guk-ryol, the then chief of the armed forces staff, said the school produced revolutionary warriors.

By 1987, graduates were:
 20% of the central party committee,
 30% of the party politburo, and
 32% of the military commission of the central committee.

, the all girls version of this school is at the Kang Pan-sok Revolutionary School in the western city of Nampho.

Kim Jong-un, who was educated in Switzerland, is not an alumnus of this school and has visited this school six times as of July 2018, the most recent being in 2022 where he attended the school's 75th anniversary.

Alumni

Kim Jong-il
the daughter of Kim Hyong-gwon
the illegitimate children of Kim Il-sung
According to Ko Young-hwan, Kim Jong-su went to this school.
 Vice Marshal Kim Yong-chun (NDC Vice Chairman and Minister of the People's Armed Forces)
 General Hyon Chol-hae (Director of the NDC Standing Committee [Presidium])
 Yon Hyong-muk, the North Korean premier in 1988-92
 Thae Jong-su
 Monica, Maribel, and Paco Macías, the three youngest children of Francisco Macías Nguema.

References

Further reading

Education in Pyongyang
Educational institutions established in 1947
1947 establishments in Korea